Dean Kino (born 15 April 1971) is an Australian former cricket administrator and first-class cricketer.

Kino was born in April 1971 at Melbourne. He later studied for a Bachelor of Laws at Monash University, before studying for his doctorate in law at Magdalen College at the University of Oxford. While studying at Oxford, he played first-class cricket for Oxford University in 1999, making five appearances. He scored 31 runs in his five matches, while with his left-arm fast-medium bowling he took 6 wickets. 

Kino joined Cricket Australia (CA) in 2004 as their general manager of legal and business affairs. Kino was staying at the Taj Mahal Palace Hotel when it came under attack during the 2008 Mumbai attacks. He escaped five and a half hours after the attack had begun at 10pm. Kino was head of the governing council for the Champions League Twenty20 (CLT20). He was an important link in the relationship between Cricket Australia and the Board of Control for Cricket in India, in addition to working alongside cricket officials Sundar Raman, N. Srinivasan and Giles Clarke in the 2014 constitutional changes in the International Cricket Council. He resigned from CA and the CLT20 in September 2014.

References

External links

1971 births
Living people
People from Melbourne
Monash University alumni
Alumni of Magdalen College, Oxford
Australian cricketers
Oxford University cricketers
Australian cricket administrators
Australian terrorism victims